Android 1.x may refer to:

 Android 1.0
 Android 1.1
 Android Cupcake (1.5)
 Android Donut (1.6)